Ethusa is a genus of crabs in the family Ethusidae.

Species
Ethusa americana A. Milne-Edwards, 1880 
Ethusa mascarone (Herbst, 1785) 
Ethusa microphthalma S. I. Smith, 1881 - Broadback Sumo Crab 
Ethusa tenuipes M. J. Rathbun, 1897 
Ethusa truncata A. Milne-Edwards & Bouvier, 1899 - Truncate Sumo Crab

References

Türkay, M. (2001). Decapoda, in: Costello, M.J. et al. (Ed.) (2001). European register of marine species: a check-list of the marine species in Europe and a bibliography of guides to their identification. Collection Patrimoines Naturels, 50: pp. 284–292

Crabs